Gilbert Poirot (21 September 1944 – 1 February 2012) was a French ski jumper. He competed at the 1968 and 1972 Winter Olympics.

References

External links
 

1944 births
2012 deaths
French male ski jumpers
Olympic ski jumpers of France
Ski jumpers at the 1968 Winter Olympics
Ski jumpers at the 1972 Winter Olympics
Sportspeople from Vosges (department)